College of Applied Science Malappuram, is established in 1993, affiliated to University of Calicut and is managed by Institute of Human Resources Development (IHRD) established by Govt. of Kerala.

Location 
The college is located at a beautiful, picturesque and serene environment suitable for good academic atmosphere.  CAS, Malappuram is nearly 3 km from Up Hill, Malappuram and is very easily accessible to other parts of the district.

U.G Courses

The college offers UG programs in B.Sc. Electronics & B. Sc. Computer Science

The following regular courses of Calicut University under the C.C.S.S scheme are offered in the College.

B.Sc Computer Science:
Duration	3 Years (6 Semesters).
No of Seats:	36 (24 seat each Programme  +  12 seats marginal increase)
Eligibility:	Pass (Eligible for Higher Studies)In Higher Secondary or Equivalent  Examination with Maths/Statistics/Computer Science/ Computer Application etc. as one of the subjects
Time of Notification:	First week of June (Just after the publication of +2 results of Kerala Govt.)
Procedure :
50% of seat direct admission and 50% by Centralized Admission Procedure of Calicut University
Application & prospectus:	log on to www.ihrd.ac.in
B.Sc Electronics:

Duration	3 Years (6 Semesters)
No of Seats:	36 (24 seat each Programme  +  12 seats marginal increase )
Eligibility:	Pass(Eligible for Higher Studies) In Higher Secondary or Equivalent  Examination with Electronics/Maths/Physics as one of the subjects
Time of Notification:	First week of June (Just after the publication of +2 results of Kerala Govt.)
Procedure :	50% of seat direct admission and 50% by Centralized Admission Procedure of Calicut University
Application & prospectus:	log on to www.ihrd.ac.in

Facilities
 Computer Lab
 Electronic Lab
 Library
Dolby & Air Conditioned Hall 
Nature Friendly Classrooms
Pool

Contact
Principal
College of Applied Science Malappuram (Govt. College Campus)
Munduparamba  P.O, Malappuram. Pin: 676509, Ph:0483-2736211

References

External links
Official website
Official Blog

Arts and Science colleges in Kerala
Colleges affiliated with the University of Calicut
Institute of Human Resources Development
Universities and colleges in Malappuram district
Education in Malappuram
Educational institutions established in 1993
Applied